Robert Terence John "Terry" Whitehead (born 10 January 1957) is a male British sprinter. Whitehead competed in the men's 4 × 400 metres relay at the 1980 Summer Olympics. He represented England in the 400 metres and 4 x 400 metres relay events, at the 1978 Commonwealth Games in Edmonton, Alberta, Canada.

References

1957 births
Living people
Athletes (track and field) at the 1978 Commonwealth Games
Athletes (track and field) at the 1980 Summer Olympics
British male sprinters
Olympic athletes of Great Britain
People from Peterborough
Commonwealth Games competitors for England